Mustapha Boay Akunaay (born 15 August 1952) is a Tanzanian CHADEMA politician and Member of Parliament for Mbulu constituency since 2010.

References

1952 births
Living people
Chadema MPs
Tanzanian MPs 2010–2015
Ilboru Secondary School alumni
Open University of Tanzania alumni